This is a list of Tamil language films produced in the Tamil cinema in India that are released/scheduled to be released in the year 2018. The list contains only those films that are made in the Tamil language.

Box office collection 
The highest-grossing Kollywood films released in 2018, by worldwide box office gross revenue, are as follows.

January—March

April  –  June

July – September

October – December

See also 
 List of Tamil films of 2017
 List of Tamil films of 2019

Notes

References 

Tamil
2018
Tamil
2010s Tamil-language films